Simonds is a civil parish in Saint John County, New Brunswick, Canada.

For governance purposes it is divided between the local service districts of Fairfield and the parish of Simonds, both of which are members of the Fundy Regional Service Commission (FRSC).

Contrary to the map image on this page, Simonds does not and never has included the City of Saint John within its boundaries, although Saint John did annex part of Simonds in 1967.

Origin of name
The parish may have been named in honour of Charles Simonds, Speaker of the House of Assembly when the parish was erected, or his family, who were prominent in the early history of the province.

History
Simonds was erected in 1839 from Portland Parish.

In 1902 an error in the boundaries of Saint John was corrected, returning part of Simonds. The error occurred in 1889 when Saint John was amalgamated with Portland Parish and its boundary description was rewritten, misstating the boundary at Drurys Cove.

In 1973 the territory annexed by Saint John in 1967 was formally removed in the revision of the Territorial Division Act.

Boundaries
Simonds Parish is bounded:

 on the north by the Kings County line;
 on the east by a line beginning at the shore of the Bay of Fundy and running northwesterly along the eastern line of a grant to Samuel Hugh at the mouth of Tynemouth Creek and its prolongation to the Kings County line;
 on the south by the Bay of Fundy;
 on the west by the City of Saint John.

Communities
Communities at least partly within the parish; italics indicate a name no longer in official use

 Baxters Corner
 Black River
 Cape Spencer
 Coleraine
 Fairfield
 Gardner Creek
 Garnett Settlement
 Grove Hill
 Mispec
 Porter
 Primrose
 Quaco Road
 Rowley
 Tynemouth Creek
 Upper Loch Lomond
 West Beach
 Willow Grove

Bodies of water
Bodies of water at least partly in the parish:

 Black River
 Mispec River
 Ritchie River
 Emerson Creek
 Gardner Creek
 Tynemouth Creek
 Third Lake Thoroughfare
 Bay of Fundy
 Mispec Bay
 more than fifteen officially named lakes

Islands
Islands in the parish:
 Split Rock

Other notable places
Parks, historic sites, and other noteworthy places in the parish.
 Cape Spencer Light

Demographics

Population
Population trend

Language
Mother tongue (2016)

Access Routes
Highways and numbered routes that run through the parish, including external routes that start or finish at the parish limits:

Highways
None

Principal Routes

Secondary Routes:

External Routes:
None

See also
List of parishes in New Brunswick

Notes

References

External links
 Town of Rothesay

Parishes of Saint John County, New Brunswick